The 1996 San Jose State Spartans football team represented San Jose State University during the 1996 NCAA Division I-A football season as a member of the Western Athletic Conference. 1996 was the first year San Jose State was a member of the Western Athletic Conference. They had previously been a member of the Big West Conference since its formation in 1969 as the Pacific Coast Athletic Association (PCAA).

The team was led by head coach John Ralston, in his fourth year as head coach at San Jose State. They played home games at Spartan Stadium in San Jose, California. The Spartans finished the 1996 season with a record of three wins and nine losses (3–9, 3–5 WAC).

Schedule

Roster

Game Summaries

at Air Force

California

at Stanford

UTEP

at Washington State

No. 25 Wyoming

at Fresno State

at Colorado State

San Diego State

at Hawaii

at No. 15 Washington

UNLV

Team players in the NFL
No San Jose State Spartans were selected in the 1997 NFL Draft.

Notes

References

San Jose State
San Jose State Spartans football seasons
San Jose State Spartans football